Richard Allen Reed (born August 16, 1964) is an American former starting pitcher in Major League Baseball who played for the Pittsburgh Pirates (1988–1991), Kansas City Royals (1992–1993), Texas Rangers (1993–1994), Cincinnati Reds (1995), New York Mets (1997–2001) and Minnesota Twins (2001–2003). He batted and threw right-handed.

Early baseball career 

After playing for Marshall University, Reed was drafted by the Pittsburgh Pirates in the 26th round of the 1986 Major League Baseball Draft. He made his major league debut for Pittsburgh in 1988, but saw only limited playing time each year through 1991. After 1991, he spent several more years mostly in the minors. A highlight of Reed's early baseball career came on June 13, 1990 when Reed picked up the only save of his major league career in a 6-5 Pirates victory over the Cardinals.

Replacement baseball

In 1995, which was Reed's 10th year of pro ball, he agreed to be a replacement player for the Cincinnati Reds during the 1994 Major League Baseball strike. Reed's mother, Sylvia, was a diabetic without health insurance, and he was paying her medical bills. Reed had been scheduled to be the Reds' opening day starter in 1995 if the strike hadn't been settled. He told reporters in 1995 that he sat in his hotel room the weekend before the scheduled start and prayed the strike would end so he wouldn't have to take the mound.  "It was their season to start, not mine," Reed said of the regular players.

After the strike

After the strike, Reed was pitching well in the minor leagues with an 8-4 record and a 3.17 earned-run average.  On July 21, 1995, Reed was recalled by Cincinnati to the consternation of several of his teammates who had gone on strike. In Reed's first major league start in 1995, he pitched  innings of no-hit baseball during a home game against the Chicago Cubs. The Cubs' Mark Grace broke up the no-hitter with an infield single off the glove of shortstop and future Hall of Famer Barry Larkin with one out in the seventh inning.

During the rest of the 1995 season in the majors, Reed did not pitch well.  He was optioned back to Triple-A Indianapolis on August 14, 1995. On October 16, 1995, Reed filed for free agency. On November 7, 1995, Reed was signed by the New York Mets system. Reed spent the 1996 season in the minors, pitching in the New York Mets' system for the Triple-A Norfolk Tides.

Return to the majors, and success

In 1997, Reed found his major league stride with the New York Mets, going 13–9 and finishing sixth in the National League with a 2.89 ERA. His most productive season came in 1998, when he won 16 games and held a 3.48 ERA, striking out 153 batters while walking just 29. An All-Star in 1998 and 2001, he also was a member of the Mets team that faced the New York Yankees in the 2000 World Series.

Reed was traded by the Mets to the Minnesota Twins for outfielder Matt Lawton midseason in 2001. He won 15 games for Minnesota in 2002 and led the American League in fewest walks per nine innings. After a disappointing 2003 season where he went 6–12 with a 5.07 ERA, Reed retired. In a 15-season career, Reed posted a 93–76 record with 970 strikeouts and a 4.03 ERA.

After the majors 

In 2005, Reed returned to Marshall University as the pitching coach for the Thundering Herd baseball team.

References

External links

1964 births
Living people
Marshall Thundering Herd baseball players
Baseball players from West Virginia
National League All-Stars
Cincinnati Reds players
Kansas City Royals players
Minnesota Twins players
Pittsburgh Pirates players
Texas Rangers players
New York Mets players
Harrisburg Senators players
Salem Buccaneers players
Macon Pirates players
Indianapolis Indians players
Norfolk Tides players
Omaha Royals players
Binghamton Mets players
Buffalo Bisons (minor league) players
Oklahoma City 89ers players
Major League Baseball pitchers
Marshall Thundering Herd baseball coaches
Sportspeople from Huntington, West Virginia
Sportspeople from Manhattan
Baseball players from New York City
Major League Baseball replacement players
Gulf Coast Pirates players